Grands-Ormes Ecological Reserve is an ecological reserve of Quebec, Canada. It was established in 1994. The reserve is enclosed by Hautes-Gorges-de-la-Rivière-Malbaie National Park.

References

External links
 Official website from Government of Québec

Protected areas of Capitale-Nationale
Nature reserves in Quebec
Protected areas established in 1994
1994 establishments in Quebec